Mastanesosus (or Sosus or Sus) was a Berber king of Mauretania (modern-day Morocco and Western Algeria) and son of Bocchus I. He ruled from around 80 BC to 49 BC.

Evidence
The little information known about King Mastanesosus comes from coins bearing the inscription "Bocchus II son of Sosus", in addition to a reference by Cicero in his book In Vatinum, where he detailed an itinerary by Publius Vatinius through North Africa. Vatinius had allegedly met King Mastanesosus in person in 62 BC.

Some historians, such as Stéphane Gsell, have confused Mastanesosus with Massinissa II of Numidia. The archaeological evidence and Cicero's reference however leave little doubt that a king named Sosus had ruled Mauretania after Bocchus I and before Bogud and Bocchus II, as had originally been conjectured by American archaeologist Duane W. Roller.

Additional evidence of the existence of a king of Mauretania named Sos or Sosus came in 2020, when a sling-bullet  was discovered bearing the Latin inscription "" (King Sos). The sling-bullet may have come from a battle that was fought by Sosus's army or in his name.

Reign
The end of Bocchus I's reign may have been weak due to his old age, and Mastanesosus' reign probably started on shaky grounds, since at the beginning of his rule, Tingi and its region were independent and ruled as such by a princely family, namely by Iephtas, then his son Ascalis. General Sertorius helped dethrone prince Ascalis around 80-81 BC, and thereby restored King Mastanesosus as ruler over the region of Tangier. It was during this campaign that general Sertorius reported visiting the tomb of Antaeus, probably at Mzoura cromlech.

Around 77-74 BC, Sallustius reports that a certain person was sent out of Mauretania in the custody of a king named Leptasta. This puts a large question as to when and how Mastanesosus became king, and how much control he had over the Kingdom of Mauretania. Apart from these little snippets of events, little is known about Mauretania during the 30 years that followed the death of King Bocchus I.

References 

2nd-century BC rulers in Africa
2nd-century BC Berber people
Kings of Mauretania
History of Morocco